Parkes Observatory is a radio astronomy observatory, located  north of the town of Parkes, New South Wales, Australia. It hosts Murriyang, the 64 m CSIRO Parkes Radio Telescope also known as "The Dish", along with two smaller radio telescopes. The 64 m dish was one of several radio antennae used to receive live television images of the Apollo 11 Moon landing. Its scientific contributions over the decades led the ABC to describe it as "the most successful scientific instrument ever built in Australia" after 50 years of operation.

The Parkes Observatory is run by the Commonwealth Scientific and Industrial Research Organisation (CSIRO), as part of the Australia Telescope National Facility (ATNF) network of radio telescopes. It is frequently operated together with other CSIRO radio telescopes, principally the array of six  dishes at the Australia Telescope Compact Array near Narrabri, and a single  dish at Mopra (near Coonabarabran), to form a very long baseline interferometry array.

The observatory was included on the Australian National Heritage List on 10 August 2020.

Design and construction

The Parkes Radio Telescope, completed in 1961, was the brainchild of E. G. "Taffy" Bowen, chief of the CSIRO's Radiophysics Laboratory. During the Second World War, he had worked on radar development in the United States and had made connections in its scientific community. Calling on this old boy network, he persuaded two philanthropic organisations, the Carnegie Corporation and the Rockefeller Foundation, to fund half the cost of the telescope. It was this recognition and key financial support from the United States that persuaded Australian prime minister, Robert Menzies, to agree to fund the rest of the project.

The Parkes site was chosen in 1956, as it was accessible, but far enough from Sydney to have clear skies. Additionally the mayor Ces Moon and landowner Australia James Helm were both enthusiastic about the project.

The success of the Parkes telescope led NASA to copy the basic design in their Deep Space Network, with matching  dishes built at Goldstone, California, Madrid, Spain, and Tidbinbilla, near Canberra in Australia.

It continues to be upgraded, and as of 2018 is 10,000 times more sensitive than its initial configuration.

Radio telescope

Hardware 

The inner part of the dish is solid metal and the outer area a fine metal mesh, creating its distinctive two-tone appearance.

In the early 1970s the outer mesh panels were replaced by perforated aluminium panels. The inner smooth plated surface was upgraded in 1975 which provided focusing capability for centimetre and millimetre length microwaves.

The inner aluminium plating was expanded out to a  diameter in 2003, improving signals by 1dB.

The telescope has an altazimuth mount. It is guided by a small mock-telescope placed within the structure at the same rotational axes as the dish, but with an equatorial mount. The two are dynamically locked when tracking an astronomical object by a laser guiding system. This primary-secondary approach was designed by Barnes Wallis.

Receivers 

The cabin contains multiple radio and microwave detectors, which can be switched into the focus beam for different science observations.

These include:

 receiver (Replaced now by UWL)
H-OH receiver (Replaced now by UWL)
GALILEO receiver (Replaced now by UWL)
AT multiband receivers, covering 2.2-2.5,4.5-5.1 and 8.1-8.7 GHz
METH6, covering 5.9-6.8 GHz
MARS (X band receiver), covering 8.1-8.5 GHz
KU-BAND, covering 12–15 GHz
13MM (K band receiver), covering 16–26 GHz
Ultra Wideband Low (UWL) receiver – installed in 2018 it can simultaneously receive signals from 700 MHz to 4 GHz.

18m "Kennedy Dish" antenna 

The  "Kennedy Dish" antenna was transferred from the Fleurs Observatory (where it was part of the Chris Cross Telescope) in 1963. Mounted on rails and powered by a tractor engine to allow the distance between the antenna and the main dish to be easily varied, it was used as an interferometer with the main dish. Phase instability due to an exposed cable meant that its pointing ability was diminished, but it was able to be used for identifying size and brightness distributions. In 1968 it successfully proved that Radio galaxy lobes were not expanding, and in the same era contributed to Hydrogen line and OH investigations. As a stand-alone antenna it was used in studying the Magellanic Stream.

It was used as an uplink antenna in the Apollo program, as the larger Parkes telescope is receive only. It is preserved by the Australia Telescope National Facility.

Australia Telescope National Facility 
The observatory is a part of the Australia Telescope National Facility network of radio telescopes. The  dish is frequently operated together with the Australia Telescope Compact Array at Narrabri, the ASKAP array in Western Australia, and a single dish at Mopra, telescopes operated by the University of Tasmania as well as telescopes from New Zealand, South Africa and Asia to form a Very Long Baseline Interferometry (VLBI) array.

Astronomy research

Timeline
1960s
 Built in 1961 and was fully operational by 1963.
 A 1962 series of lunar occultations of the radio source 3C 273 observed by the Parkes Telescope were used to locate its exact position, allowing astronomers to find and study its visual component. Soon to be called "quasi-stellar radio sources" (quasar), Parkes observation was the first time this type of object to be associated with an optical counterpart.
 1964 to 1966, all-sky survey at 408 MHz of the southern sky is conducted and published (first version of the Parkes Catalogue of Radio Sources) finding over 2000 radio sources including many new quasars.
 Second all-sky survey at 2,700 MHz begins in 1968 (completed in 1980).

1990s
 June and November 1990, Parkes collaborates with the  Massachusetts Institute of Technology and the National Radio Astronomy Observatory  to conduct a 5GHZ (6 cm) all-sky survey (The Parkes-MIT-NRAO (PMN) Surveys). The Telescope is equipped with a NRAO multi-beam receiver operating at a frequency of 4850 MHz.
 Between 1997 and 2002 it conducted the H I Parkes All Sky Survey (HIPASS) neutral hydrogen survey, the largest blind survey for galaxies in the hydrogen line (21-centimeter line or H I line) to date.

2000s
 More than half of currently known pulsars were discovered by the Parkes Observatory.
 Vital component of the  programme to detect gravity waves as part of the broader International Pulsar Timing Array (IPTA), which also includes the North American Nanohertz Observatory for Gravitational Waves (NANOGrav) and the European Pulsar Timing Array (EPTA).

Fast radio burst

Fast radio bursts were discovered in 2007 when Duncan Lorimer of West Virginia University assigned his student David Narkevic to look through archival data recorded in 2001 by the Parkes radio dish.
Analysis of the survey data found a 30-jansky dispersed burst which occurred on 24 July 2001, less than 5 milliseconds in duration, located 3° from the Small Magellanic Cloud. At the time it was theorised FRBs might be signals from another galaxy, emissions from neutron stars or black holes. More recent results confirm that magnetars, a kind of highly magnetised neutron star, may be one source of fast radio bursts.

Peryton discovery 
In 1998 Parkes telescope began detecting fast radio bursts and similar looking signals named perytons. Perytons were thought to be of terrestrial origin, such as interference from lightning strikes. In 2015 it was determined that perytons were caused by staff members opening the door of the facility's microwave oven during its cycle. When the microwave oven door was opened, 1.4 GHz microwaves from the magnetron shutdown phase were able to escape. Subsequent tests revealed that a peryton can be generated at 1.4 GHz when a microwave oven door is opened prematurely and the telescope is at an appropriate relative angle.

Breakthrough Listen 
The telescope has been contracted to be used in a search for radio signals from extraterrestrial technologies for the heavily funded project Breakthrough Listen. The principal role of the Parkes Telescope in the program will be to conduct a survey of the Milky Way galactic plane over 1.2 to 1.5 GHz and a targeted search of approximately 1000 nearby stars over the frequency range 0.7 to 4 GHz.

Historical non-astronomy research 

During the Apollo missions to the Moon, the Parkes Observatory was used to relay communication and telemetry signals to NASA, providing coverage for when the Moon was on the Australian side of the Earth.

The telescope also played a role in relaying data from the NASA Galileo mission to Jupiter that required radio-telescope support due to the use of its backup telemetry subsystem as the principal means to relay science data.

The observatory has remained involved in tracking numerous space missions up to the present day, including:
 Mariner 2
 Mariner 4
 Voyager missions (but no longer due to distance of the probes, only the  dish at the CDSCC can still communicate with the two Voyager probes, Voyager 1 and Voyager 2.)
 Giotto
 Galileo
 Cassini-Huygens (until 2017)

The CSIRO has made several documentaries on this observatory, with some of these documentaries being posted to YouTube.

Apollo 11 broadcast

When Buzz Aldrin switched on the TV camera on the Lunar Module, three tracking antennas received the signals simultaneously. They were the  Goldstone antenna in California, the  antenna at Honeysuckle Creek near Canberra in Australia, and the  dish at Parkes.

Since they started the spacewalk early, the Moon was only just above the horizon and below the visibility of the main Parkes receiver. Although they were able to pick up a quality signal from the off axis receiver, the international broadcast alternated between signals from Goldstone and Honeysuckle Creek, the latter of which ultimately broadcast Neil Armstrong's first steps on the Moon worldwide.

A little under nine minutes into the broadcast, the Moon rose far enough to be picked by the main antenna and the international broadcast switched to the Parkes signal. The quality of the TV pictures from Parkes was so superior that NASA stayed with Parkes as the source of the TV for the remainder of the 2.5-hour broadcast.

Mars rovers
In 2012 the observatory received special signals from the Mars rover Opportunity (MER-B), to simulate the Curiosity rover UHF radio. This helped prepare for the then upcoming Curiosity (MSL) landing in early Augustit successfully touched down on 6 August 2012.

Visitors Centre
The Parkes Observatory Visitors Centre allows visitors to view the dish as it moves. There are exhibits about the history of the telescope, astronomy, and space science, and a 3-D movie theatre.

Legacy 

In 1995 the radio telescope was declared a National Engineering Landmark by Engineers Australia. The nomination cited its status as the largest southern hemisphere radio telescope, elegant structure, with features mimicked by later Deep Space Network telescopes, scientific discoveries and social importance through "enhancing [Australia's] image as a technologically advanced nation".

On Monday, 31 October 2011, Google Australia replaced its logo with a Google Doodle in honour of Parkes Observatory's 50th anniversary.

The Parkes Radio Telescope was added to the National Heritage List in 2020.

In popular culture 
 In 1964 the telescope featured in the opening credit sequence of The Stranger, Australia's first locally produced sci-fi TV series. Some scenes were also shot on location at the telescope and inside the observatory.
 The observatory and telescope were featured in the 2000 film The Dish, a fictionalised account of the observatory's involvement with the Apollo 11 Moon landing.
 The telescope is featured on the cover of Steve Hillage's 1977 album Motivation Radio.

Wiradjuri names 
In November 2020, in NAIDOC Week, the Observatory's three telescopes were given Wiradjuri names. The main telescope ("The Dish") is Murriyang, after the home in the stars of Biyaami, the creator spirit. The smaller 12m dish built in 2008 is Giyalung Miil, meaning "Smart Eye". The third, decommissioned antenna is Giyalung Guluman, meaning "Smart Dish".

See also
 Apollo 11 missing tapes
 John Gatenby Bolton
 List of astronomical observatories
 List of radio telescopes

References

External links

 Official website 
 Parkes Observatory Visitors Centre
 A Tour of the Parkes Radio Telescope (1979)
 ABC Science, 2001: 40 years of the Dish
 View the dish in action
 Observation of Mariner IV with the Parkes 210-ft Radio Telescope
 The sound of the Universe singing - ABC Radio National radio documentary on the story of 'the dish' since its construction
 Parkes Pulsar Timing Array

Space programme of Australia
Radio telescopes
Astronomical observatories in New South Wales
Rockefeller Foundation
Central West (New South Wales)
Tourist attractions in New South Wales
CSIRO
1961 establishments in Australia
Buildings and structures completed in 1961
Articles containing video clips
Recipients of Engineers Australia engineering heritage markers
Earth stations in Australia
Parkes Shire
Barnes Wallis
Australian National Heritage List